Clodoaldo (born 1949), Clodoaldo Tavares de Santana, is a Brazilian football midfielder.

Clodoaldo is a given name. It may also refer to:

 Clodoaldo Caldeira (1899-unknown), known as Clodô, Brazilian football defender
 Clodoaldo do Carmo (born 1968), Brazilian steeplechase runner
 Clodoaldo Soto Ruiz (fl. 1976-present), Peruvian scholar and author
 Clodoaldo (footballer, born November 1978), Clodoaldo Paulino de Lima, Brazilian football striker and attacking midfielder
 Clodoaldo (footballer, born December 1978), Francisco Clodoaldo Chagas Ferreira, Brazilian football striker
 Clodoaldo Silva (born 1979), Brazilian Paralympic swimmer

See also
 Clodoald (522-560), Merovingian prince, hermit and monk
 Clodualdo del Mundo (disambiguation)